Texas German is a group of German language dialects spoken in Texas by descendants of German immigrants who settled there in the mid-19th century. These "German Texans" founded the towns of Bulverde, New Braunfels, Fredericksburg, Boerne, Pflugerville, Walburg and Comfort in Texas Hill Country; Muenster in North Central Texas; and Schulenburg, Brenham, Industry, New Ulm and Weimar in east Texas.

History and documentation 
While most heritage languages in the United States die out by the third generation, Texas German is unusual in that most German Texans continued to speak German in their homes and communities for several generations after settling in the state. The State of Texas recognized German as having equal status to Spanish from 1846 up until World War I, when Texan education rules were established mandating English-only instruction, requiring children to learn English in school regardless of what was spoken at home. Due to the assimilation of these communities and public hostility towards the German language during both World War I and World War II, Texas German speakers drifted towards English, and few passed the language to their descendants. By 1950, the number of new speakers of the language was virtually zero.

The dialects are near extinction, as they are now spoken almost exclusively by a few elderly German Texans. 

Currently, Dr. Hans Boas at the University of Texas is recording and studying the dialect, building on research originally performed by Dr. Glenn Gilbert of Southern Illinois University Carbondale in the 1960s.

Boas' book on the language, The Life and Death of Texas German, describes the German dialects which may have been the source of the language spoken in Texas.

A short documentary project named "All Güt Things" was produced about Texas German in 2016.

An episode with the title "Texas German" was published on the podcast Yellow of the Egg in 2022, where Dr. Hans C. Boas (Director of the Texas German Dialect Project) was a guest.

Current distribution and population 

As of the U.S. 2000 Census, some 1,035 people report speaking German at home in Fredericksburg, the town with the largest community of Texas German speakers, representing 12.48% of the total population, 840 in New Braunfels, 150 in Schulenburg, 85 in Stonewall, 70 in Boerne, 65 in Harper, 45 in Comfort and 19 in Weimar, all of which except for Schulenburg and Weimar, lie in the traditional Texas German heartland of the Hill Country. Gillespie County, with the communities of Fredericksburg, Harper, Stonewall, and Luckenbach, has a German-speaking population of 2,270, 11.51% of the county's total. In all, 82,100 German-speakers reside in the state of Texas, including European German speakers.

Comparisons with German and English 
Texas German is adapted to U.S. measurement and legal terminologies. Standard American German words typically were invented, introduced from other German dialects of the region, or English loanwords were introduced for words not present in 19th-century German. Dialect leveling is also found throughout many of the American German dialects including Texas German. In some cases, these new words also exist in modern Standard German, but with a different meaning. For instance, the word  (used for "airplane") means airship in Standard German.

The table below illustrates some examples of differences:

See also

 German Texan
 New Braunfels, Texas
 Czech Texan
 Pennsylvania German
 Hutterite German
 Plautdietsch
 German language in the United States

References

Sources

External links 
 "All Gut Things" crowdsourcing project
 Texas German Dialect Project
 
 

German dialects
New Braunfels, Texas
German-American culture in Texas
Endangered diaspora languages
Texas Hill Country
German-American history
Gillespie County, Texas
German language in the United States
Languages of Texas